The women's pairs competition in Lawn Bowls at the 2010 Commonwealth Games began on 4 October 2010 and finished on 11 October 2010.

Results

Qualifying – round robin

Section A

Section B

Knockout stages

See also
Lawn bowls at the 2010 Commonwealth Games

References

Lawn bowls at the 2010 Commonwealth Games
Comm